Shri Dhyanyogi Madhusudandas, also known as Kashinath and Madhusudandas, was an Indian yogi and author born in Bihar, India. His disciples included Shri Anandi Ma and Omdasji Maharaj. He was a master of Kundalini Maha Yoga who was responsible for popularising it in the United States.

Bibliography

References 

 Shri Anandi Ma, "This House Is on Fire: The Life of Shri Dhyanyogi,” Dhyanyoga Centers (28 September 2005), .
 Shri Dhyanyogi Madhusudandas, “Shakti: An Introduction to Kundalini Maha Yoga”
 Dhyanyogi is a portmanteau of the Sanskrit words Dhyana (meditation) and yogi.

External links
 1979 New Dimensions radio interview

Indian Hindu spiritual teachers
Indian Hindu saints
People from Bihar
1878 births
1994 deaths
20th-century Hindu religious leaders